Pinocchio's Revenge is a 1996 American psychological slasher film written and directed by Kevin S. Tenney and distributed by Trimark Pictures. It stars Rosalind Allen and Todd Allen and was released direct-to-video. The film's plot concerns a lawyer who brings home a wooden puppet that was found buried with a boy supposedly killed by his father. Her 8-year-old daughter Zoe sees the doll and takes it as her own. Soon accidents start happening and Jennifer struggles to find the cause as she begins to question her daughter's wellbeing and whether or not there may be something sinister to the doll. The movie is closer "to Don Mancini's original intent for Child's Play".

Conceptualised as Bad Pinocchio, written as The Pinocchio Syndrome, shot as ‘Pinocchio’, and, finally, released on VHS and Laserdisc on 23rd September 1997.

Plot
Despite overwhelming evidence, Jennifer Garrick (Rosalind Allen), the lawyer defending convicted child murderer Vincent Gotto (Lewis Van Bergen), believes her client is not guilty and is hiding the identity of the real killer. A fellow attorney in Jennifer's office (Ron Canada) explains the presence of a large Pinocchio-type puppet sitting in her chair, previously buried by Gotto in his son's grave, as belatedly delivered evidence which she had earlier requisitioned. Intending to examine the puppet in the hope of finding a clue which might prevent Gotto's execution, Jennifer brings it home and her emotionally fragile daughter Zoe (Brittany Alyse Smith) mistakes it for a birthday gift.

Zoe develops a relationship with the Pinocchio puppet and becomes unbalanced to an even greater degree. Trouble begins when Zoe's bully at school is pushed in front of a bus, which Zoe blames on Pinocchio trying to protect her. Soon after, Jennifer's boyfriend David Kaminsky (Todd Allen) is knocked down the basement stairs while babysitting Zoe, but is saved when she calls 9-1-1. Later, Zoe is at one of her therapy sessions when her psychiatrist, Dr. Edwards (Aaron Lustig), has to leave the room. Zoe begins talking with Pinocchio about who is to blame for David's accident, with each placing blame on the other. Jennifer and Dr. Edwards watch the argument through a video feed, seeing that Zoe is talking to herself.

That night, Pinocchio convinces Zoe to set him free on the pretense that he will confess to David about causing his accident. Zoe makes him promise he will not do anything bad and cuts his strings, at which point Pinocchio takes off for the hospital with Zoe in pursuit. Through a first-person perspective, an unknown person walks into David's room and unplugs his life support machine, killing him. When Zoe denies to Jennifer that she visited the hospital and blames David's death on Pinocchio, an angry and confused Jennifer locks the puppet in the trunk of her car.

That night, Zoe is left in the care of babysitter Sophia (Candace McKenzie), who reminds Zoe that she gave Pinocchio a conscience in the form of a cricket she caught earlier. Zoe runs to her room to check on the cricket, only to find it killed. Sophia runs to the sound of Zoe's screams, only to be attacked and killed by someone wielding a fireplace poker. Jennifer arrives home to find the babysitter dead and Zoe standing in a dark hallway. When she tries to confront Zoe, the girl runs away in a panic. As Jennifer explores the house, she is struck by the poker and sees her daughter standing above her with it in her hand.

Zoe explains that she just managed to get the poker away from Pinocchio, but before Jennifer can inquire further, she vanishes. Jennifer stands up to see Pinocchio standing in the room, at which point he suddenly turns towards her and attacks her with a knife. Following a pursuit through the house, Jennifer throws Pinocchio through a glass coffee table, only to see that her daughter is suddenly lying in the puppet's place. The movie closes with a catatonic Zoe being committed. Jennifer vows not to give up until Zoe recovers and comes home, to which Dr. Edwards states, "I hope not, for your sake, I hope not."

Cast
 Lewis Van Bergen as Vincent Gotto
 Larry Cedar as District Attorney
 Janet MacLachlan as Judge Allen
 Rosalind Allen as Jennifer Garrick
 Brittany Alyse Smith as Zoe Garrick
 Candace McKenzie as Sophia
 Ron Canada as Barry
 Tara Hartman as Beth
 Aaron Lustig as Dr. Bert Edwards
 Todd Allen as David Kaminsky
 Sal Viscuso and Ed Bernard as Jail Guards
 Dick Beals as The Voice of Pinocchio
Verne Troyer as Pinocchio Double

See also
 Killer toys

References

External links

1996 films
1996 horror films
Films directed by Kevin S. Tenney
Pinocchio films
American psychological horror films
Films about mother–daughter relationships
Horror films based on children's franchises
1990s English-language films
1990s American films
Horror films about toys